An Itch in Time is a 1943 Warner Bros. Merrie Melodies cartoon, directed by Bob Clampett. The short was released on December 4, 1943 and features Elmer Fudd, with a dog and cat that look similar to Willoughby and Claude Cat.

The voice of A. Flea is uncredited and was provided by Sara Berner, except for the character screaming "T-Bone!" which was done by Mel Blanc.  Blanc also performs the voice of the dog and the cat.  As usual, Arthur Q. Bryan is the voice of Elmer.

A. Flea would make another appearance in 1947's A Horse Fly Fleas, directed by Robert McKimson, in which the "A" in the flea's name is revealed to stand for "Anthony".

Plot
Elmer Fudd is laughing while lounging in his easy chair and reading his comic book (which is later revealed to have Bugs Bunny and Porky Pig on its cover), his dog nearby, sleeping comfortably in front of the fireplace. All is peaceful until a flea comes bouncing by, dressed in a farmer's-type outfit with a big straw hat, and carrying a satchel inscribed "A. Flea". Pulling out his telescope and spotting the dog, he whistles and shouts in excitement before beginning to sing "Food Around the Corner", which becomes a recurring theme throughout the cartoon. Having awakened the dog by bouncing off his nose, the flea, hiding by the animal's ear, begins softly crooning so as to lull him back to sleep. This is successful, so the flea finds a suitable portion to begin eating. He takes a bite, which immediately jolts the dog awake, "Yipe! Agony, agony, agony!"  He then begins scratching and biting, causing A. Flea to run, though he manages to make it so the dog bites himself.

Elmer reacts, after the dog has leapt, whining, into his lap, by employing the use of flea powder.  The flea is not phased, he simply skates on the powder as if it is ice.  Elmer threatens to give the dog a bath if he witnesses him scratching again, which the dog – thinking about how much he hates baths – promises not to do.  A. Flea continues searching for and measuring out various selections of the dog's person; he makes use of pickaxes, jackhammers and even explosives while the dog tries to withstand the itching and the overall pain. At one point, he deliberately angers the cat in order to enjoy the claws scratching his back. An angry-looking Elmer catches them and they both retreat as if they have been scolded.

Finally, after A. Flea sets off an explosion in his fur, the dog cannot stand it any longer. Yelping and dragging his posterior across the floor, at one point he stops briefly and says to viewers, "Hey, I better cut this out. I may get to like it." (reportedly an attempt by Clampett to bait the Hays Office censors, who ultimately left the gag intact). Elmer advances and the dog, realizing a bath is imminent, brakes and slides to a halt. He begs not to be taken for the bath, but Elmer grabs him and begins dragging him toward the inevitable. Suddenly, the flea is on Elmer, who begins to scratch. The dog then proceeds to carry him for a bath. There is a bar of soap on the floor on which the dog slips, landing both of them in the kitchen sink. The flea soon carries the two away on a plate, labelled as a "Blue Plate special", while singing about no more Meatless Tuesdays. Upon witnessing A. Flea carrying the dog and Elmer out of the house, Elmer's cat remarks, "Well, now I've seen everything." He then commits suicide by shooting himself in the head with a pistol (the shooting is cut from all modern airings).

Production
Director Bob Clampett wrote the flea's song, "Food Around the Corner".

Reception
Animator Michael Sporn writes, "In Bob McKimson's animation, the film is as funny as it is artful. McKimson remade the film a few years later in a half-hearted attempt called A Horse Fly Fleas (1947), adding a now controversial scene with American Indians; his direction wasn't nearly as good as Clampett's in the earlier film."

Cast
 Sara Berner as A. Flea
 Mel Blanc as Willoughby the Dog / Claude the Cat / A. Flea (screaming)
 Arthur Q. Bryan as Elmer Fudd

References

External links

 https://web.archive.org/web/20070509101953/http://looney.goldenagecartoons.com/looney-dvd3.html

1943 films
1943 short films
1943 comedy films
1943 animated films
1940s animated short films
1940s Warner Bros. animated short films
American comedy short films
Merrie Melodies short films
Elmer Fudd films
Animated films about cats
Animated films about dogs
Animated films about insects
Films about suicide
Films directed by Bob Clampett
Films produced by Leon Schlesinger
Films scored by Carl Stalling
Warner Bros. Cartoons animated short films
1940s English-language films